Vice Admiral Sir Theodore John Hallett KBE CB (10 January 1878 – 16 December 1956) was a Royal Navy officer who became Commander-in-Chief, Coast of Scotland.

Naval career
Hallett joined the Royal Navy as a midshipman in 1894.

He went on to be Naval Assistant to the Second Sea Lord in 1922, Captain of the Fleet for the Mediterranean Fleet in 1924 and Commander-in-Chief, Coast of Scotland in 1929. He was then appointed Aide-de-Camp to the King and retired in 1933.

He was recalled during the Second World War to serve as a beachmaster for the Dunkirk evacuation in June 1940 and then became Commandant of the Combined Operations Training Centre in October 1940. He later saw action as a member of the expeditionary force to Narvik in Norway in 1942.

Family
In 1908 he married Helen Blanche Dalkeyne; they had two children.

References

External links
 

1878 births
1956 deaths
Knights Commander of the Order of the British Empire
Companions of the Order of the Bath
Royal Navy vice admirals
Royal Navy personnel of World War I
People from Stratford-on-Avon District
Royal Navy personnel of World War II